Global Warming is an album by the jazz saxophonist Sonny Rollins, released on the Milestone label in 1998. It contains performances by Rollins with Stephen Scott, Bob Cranshaw, Idris Muhammad, Clifton Anderson, Victor See Yuen and Perry Wilson.

Reception

The AllMusic review by Cub Koda states: "Rollins' blowing is impassioned throughout and the surroundings are nice and intimate, making this a very inspired set."

Track listing
All compositions by Sonny Rollins except as indicated
 "Island Lady" - 9:07  
 "Echo-Side Blue" - 7:15  
 "Global Warming" - 6:30  
 "Mother Nature's Blues" - 11:26  
 "Change Partners" (Irving Berlin) - 8:36  
 "Clear-Cut Boogie" - 7:07  
Recorded in NY on January 7 (tracks 2, 4 & 5) and February 28 (tracks 1, 3 & 6), 1998

Personnel
Sonny Rollins - tenor saxophone
Stephen Scott - piano, kalimba
Bob Cranshaw - electric bass
Idris Muhammad - drums (tracks 2, 4 & 5)
Clifton Anderson - trombone (tracks 1, 3 & 6) 
Perry Wilson - drums (tracks 1, 3 & 6)
Victor See Yuen - percussion (tracks 1, 3 & 6)

References

1998 albums
Milestone Records albums
Sonny Rollins albums